The Argus may refer to:

Publications

Australia
 The Argus (Melbourne), a defunct newspaper in Melbourne, Australia
 The Northern Argus, the original name of The Evening News (Rockhampton), Queensland
 The Northern Argus, Clare, South Australia
 The Southern Argus, Strathalbyn, South Australia

United Kingdom
 The Argus (Brighton), a newspaper in Brighton and Hove, East Sussex, England
 South Wales Argus, known locally as The Argus, a daily tabloid newspaper published in Newport, Wales
 Telegraph & Argus a newspaper in Bradford, West Yorkshire, England

United States
Listed alphabetically by state
 The Argus, an Arizona newspaper published 1895–1900 in Holbrook, Arizona
 The Argus (Fremont), a newspaper in the San Francisco Bay Area, California
 The Wesleyan Argus, the student-run newspaper of Wesleyan University in Middletown, Connecticut
 The Argus, the student-run newspaper of Illinois Wesleyan University in Bloomington, Illinois
 The Argus, a literary magazine of Northwestern State University in Louisiana
 St. Louis Argus, originally The Argus, a newspaper focused on African American issues founded in 1912 in St. Louis, Missouri
 The Hillsboro Argus, a defunct newspaper in Hillsboro, Oregon
 Argus Observer, a newspaper in Ontario, Oregon
 Argus Leader, a newspaper in Sioux Falls, South Dakota
 Barre Montpelier Times Argus, Barre, Vermont
 Virginia Argus, common name of the Virginia Argus and Hampshire Advertiser, a defunct weekly newspaper published in Romney, Virginia
 The Argus (Seattle), a defunct newspaper in Seattle, Washington

Other places
 The Argus, the former name of the Cape Argus, a newspaper in Cape Town, South Africa
 The Argus (Dundalk), a newspaper in Dundalk, Ireland
 The Argus (Thunder Bay), a student newspaper of Lakehead University, in Thunder Bay, Ontario, Canada

Other
 The Argus, the common name of a major cycling event in South Africa, the Cape Argus Cycle Tour
 "The Argus", a song by Ween from their album Quebec

See also
 Argus (disambiguation)
 Argus Panoptes (the mythological all-seeing giant)